Danielle Josephine "Dani" Bowman (née Danielle Josephine Buet, born 31 October 1988) is an English football coach and a retired international footballer. She is currently a first-team coach for West Ham United.

Club career
Bowman (then Buet) joined Notts County Ladies at the start of the 2015 season from Chelsea.

She joined Chelsea from Arsenal Ladies in 2007. This was due to a lack of first team chances and the club not giving her a UEFA Women's Cup medal despite taking part in the tournament. She scored twice on her Chelsea debut, a 9–1 win over Crewe Alexandra in the FA Women's Premier League Cup.

In October 2008 she was named FA Women's Premier League Player of the Month for September. That season Buet and Chelsea suffered the disappointment of a shock FA Women's Cup semi-final defeat to Northern Division Sunderland.

International career
Buet played for England at Under-17 and Under-19 level and was a member of the victorious Under-19 European Championship side. She made her senior debut in March 2009, against South Africa, as a second-half substitute for Emily Westwood, having received her first call-up to the senior squad the previous September. Her first senior start came the same month in the 3–0 win against Scotland. In August 2009 she was named in coach Hope Powell's squad for Euro 2009.

Personal life
She attended St. Simon Stock Catholic School in Maidstone, followed by Loughborough University on the Talented Athlete Scholarship Scheme.

In the summer of 2019, Danielle married and took the surname Bowman.

References

External links
Danielle Buet profile at Chelsea FC website
Danielle Buet  profile at TheFA.com

English women's footballers
Arsenal W.F.C. players
Chelsea F.C. Women players
Notts County L.F.C. players
England women's international footballers
FA Women's National League players
1988 births
Living people
People from Chatham, Kent
Women's Super League players
Women's association football midfielders
Brighton & Hove Albion W.F.C. players
LGBT association football players
21st-century English LGBT people